Maue is a surname. Notable people with the surname include:

Michael Maue (born 1960), German cyclist
Paul Maue (born 1932), German cyclist

See also 
 Maue, Angola
 Maue